Hugo Daniel Tocalli (born 21 January 1948) is an Argentine former professional football player and coach. He played over 400 games as a goalkeeper, and went on to coach a number of clubs as well as the Argentina under-20 team.

Playing career
Tocalli started his playing career in 1970 with Deportivo Morón. In 1971, he joined Nueva Chicago where he played until 1974.

In 1975, Tocalli started his first spell with Quilmes before moving to Argentinos Juniors in 1977 where he was a teammate of the young Diego Maradona.

Tocalli returned to Quilmes in 1978 and was part of the team that won the  Metropolitano championship in 1978. He stayed with the club until 1983.

Tocalli had short spells with Unión de Santa Fe and Atlanta before retiring in 1985.

Managerial career
After retiring as a player Tocalli worked with the youth team of Vélez Sarsfield and had a brief stint as caretaker manager during the 1988–1989 season. In 1989, he became the manager of Quilmes. He then had spells in charge at Tigre and Deportivo Italiano before returning to Quilmes in 1994.

In 1994, Tocalli became involved with the Argentine youth team, alongside José Pékerman. After Peckerman became the national team coach, Tocalli took over as Under-20 coach, leading the team to the 2007 FIFA U-20 World Cup title. In October 2007, he resigned as head coach of the U-20 team and, in December 2007, he became the manager of Velez Sarsfield. On 21 April 2010 the Coach has left Colo-Colo due to family reasons. Quilmes Atlético Club hired Tocalli as coach on 3 June 2010. However, he resigned after the 11th fixture of the 2010–11 season, as Quilmes was unable to win any games under his coaching (6 draws, 5 defeats).

References

1948 births
Living people
Sportspeople from Córdoba Province, Argentina
Argentine footballers
Argentine expatriate footballers
Association football goalkeepers
Nueva Chicago footballers
Quilmes Atlético Club footballers
América de Cali footballers
Deportivo Morón footballers
Argentinos Juniors footballers
Unión de Santa Fe footballers
Club Atlético Atlanta footballers
Argentine football managers
Club Atlético Vélez Sarsfield managers
Argentina national under-20 football team managers
Quilmes Atlético Club managers
Club Atlético Tigre managers
Colo-Colo managers
Argentine Primera División players
Categoría Primera A players
Expatriate football managers in Chile
Expatriate footballers in Colombia
Sportivo Italiano managers
Chile national under-20 football team managers